Dreamspeaker is a novel by Canadian author Anne Cameron under the pen name Cam Hubert. It was first published in 1978 by Clarke, Irwin & Company.

It centers on the life of an 11-year-old boy, Peter Baxter, who is committed to an institution for delinquent boys. He was in different foster homes previously. His foster mother left him to starve and never brought him to the doctor, leaving him sick. He ran away by hopping on a train and later meets a First Nations man. The story won the Gibson Award for literature.

In 1976 a television film was directed by Claude Jutra for the CBC Television drama anthology series For the Record, starring Ian Tracey as Peter Baxter. The film won seven Canadian Film Awards, including Non-Feature Direction, Non-Feature Screenplay, Non-Feature Actor (Clutesi), Non-Feature Supporting Actor (Hubert), Non-Feature Musical Score.

References

External links

Canadian children's novels
1978 Canadian novels
1976 films
Films directed by Claude Jutra
First Nations films
CBC Television original films
Canadian novels adapted into films
1978 children's books
Avon (publisher) books
Canadian drama television films
1970s Canadian films